Nižný Čaj is a village and municipality in Košice-okolie District in the Košice Region of eastern Slovakia.

Etymology
Nižný (Lower) Čaj and Vyšný (Upper) Čaj come from Slavic personal name Čavoj (ča-: to expect, voj: militia, warrior).

History
In historical records the village was first mentioned in 1335.

Geography
The municipality lies at an altitude 207 metres and covers an area of 2.946 km². It has a population of about 271 people.

References

Villages and municipalities in Košice-okolie District